The Parisian Cobbler is a 1928 Soviet silent drama film directed by Fridrikh Ermler.

Plot
Komsomol girl Katya Karnakova (Veronica Buzhinskaya), a darling of the small provincial town Old Lopsha, is seriously smitten with a fellow Komsomol Andrei (Valery Solovtsov) and does not even try to hide this from others. After some time as a result of their affair, she becomes pregnant. Katya tells the news to Andrei. But he is not pleased with this news. Because birth of a child and fussing around with diapers are not included in Andrei's plans of constructing a "bright future" on a global scale. Therefore, Katya hears in response to her admission: "Oh, you dummy, dummy!" And then he promises: "Okay, I will think about it!"

At first he tries to talk about this with the secretary of the Komsomol, Grisha Sokolov (Semyon Antonov), but he without even listening gives him a book edited by Nikolai Semashko titled "Gender Issues" to Andrei, making it clear that the conversation was over. And Andrei does not find anything better to do than to request help with his problem from Motka Tundelyu (Jacob Gudkin), a well-known troublemaker of a neighborhood gang. In response, he gives him "worthwhile" advice; "Katya should be dishonored... trouble will take place ... and she will lay off." Then Andrei offers Katya to come to the ravine at dawn. And he warns her: "Only without philistinism!" She comes at the appointed time, but instead of Andrei, she is met by strange guys from a local gang of punks. Katya is about to leave, but Motka Tundel persuades her to sit down and passes her a note from Andrei, in which he offers Katya to get together with several "reliable" guys, after which the situation resolves by itself.

Cast
 Veronika Buzhinskaya 
 Bella Chernova 
 Yakov Gudkin 
 Aleksandr Melnikov 
 Varvara Myasnikova 
 Fyodor Nikitin 
 Valeri Solovtsov

References

Bibliography 
 Christie, Ian & Taylor, Richard. The Film Factory: Russian and Soviet Cinema in Documents 1896-1939. Routledge, 2012.

External links 
 

1928 films
1928 drama films
Soviet drama films
Soviet silent films
1920s Russian-language films
Films directed by Fridrikh Ermler
Soviet black-and-white films
Silent drama films